The General Police Inspectorate is the national civilian police force of the Republic of Moldova. It is a state institution subordinated to the Ministry of Internal Affairs, that regulates law enforcement in Moldova. The current Chief of the General Police Inspectorate is currently  Viorel Cernauteanu.

History 
The IGP was established as the Police of the Republic of Moldova on 13 September 1990, after the Government of Moldova adopted resolution no. 321 "On the reform of the bodies of the Ministry of Internal Affairs of the Moldovan SSR", which provided for the creation of the police and district police stations. Thus, the place of the Soviet-era militia was occupied by the new police.

On 18 December 1990, the Parliament of Moldova adopted the Law on police. In 1995 the national police of Moldova were under the direction of the Ministry of Interior. Internal troops were reported to have 2,500 men, and the numbers of riot police were put at 900. The scope and quality of Moldova's state security apparatus were difficult to determine. Like the armed forces, local assets of the former Moldavian KGB were transferred to the new government along with those personnel who wished to enter the service of the new government. These elements functioned at the time under the republic's Ministry of National Security before being transferred to the MAI.

On 27 December 2012, a law which entered into force on 5 March 2013 established the General Police Inspectorate under the MAI. On 24 April 2013, the new police uniform was approved. On 8 April 2014, the Strategic Development Program was approved, a basic document of the Police, elaborated for a period of 3 years, which ensures the prioritization of the various objectives for the IGP.

Organization 

As a law enforcement body of state power, the police of the Republic of Moldova are divided into state and municipal. State police perform their duties throughout the republic, municipal - in the territory of the corresponding administrative unit. State and municipal police carry out their tasks in close cooperation. The State Police provides the municipal police with methodological and advisory assistance, as well as assists in the implementation of the duties assigned to it by their own forces and means. The municipal police assist the state police in carrying out operational investigative measures, timely inform them of the persons and facts of interest to them.

Institutions under the PGI are:
National Inspectorate of Investigations
National Patrol Inspectorate
Police Department of Chisinau Municipality
General Directorate of Criminal Investigation
Special Forces Brigade "Fulger"
Chinologic Center
Technical-Forensic Center and Judicial Expertise
Center for International Police Cooperation (Interpol)
Judicial Police
Procurement and Logistics Service
Directorate of Inspection
General Directorate for Public Security
42 police inspectorates at district level

Recognition
On the inspectorate's 30th anniversary in 2017, the Police Directorate of the Chisinau Municipality was awarded by President Igor Dodon the Order of Ștefan cel Mare.

Uniform 
The IGP has a summer outfit, a spring-autumn outfit and a winter outfit. The parade dress is worn during the participation in the festivities (taking the oath, awarding of ministerial and departmental distinctions, march pasts, national holidays, and official receptions).

Controversial issues

Public perception 
The common lack of respect towards law, in general, among Moldovans results in a predominant distrust for police. This is not helped by the fact that police incompetency due to various reasons is frequent.

Ill-treatment by police 

Moldova is not a part of the EU. Torture and ill-treatment in Moldova remain widespread and systemic despite some initial legislative steps made by the government to change police practices in order to eradicate it, Amnesty International said in October 2007. "Although efforts have been made to bring legislation into line with international and European standards, practice and attitudes are lagging behind. Beatings and abuse of detainees remain the norm. Channels for seeking redress stay blocked. Lack of transparency breeds impunity," Amnesty Internationals researcher said. The events during the April 2009 Moldova civil unrest have drawn criticism of human rights violations, including in regard to the deaths of Valeriu Boboc, Ion Ţâbuleac, and Eugen Ţapu

See also

Law Enforcement in Moldova 
Trupele de Carabinieri
Moldovan Border Police
Crime in Moldova

References

External links
 Internal Affairs Ministry
 Moldova Police (IGP)